Gypona is a genus of leafhopper belonging to the family Cicadellidae.

The species of this genus are found in Southern America.

Species:
 Gypona abdominalis Spångberg, 1878 
 Gypona abscida DeLong & Freytag, 1964

References

Cicadellidae
Hemiptera genera